Chayawat Srinawong (born January 12, 1993) is a Thai professional footballer who plays as a forward or a winger for Thai League 1 club Bangkok United .

International career

In 2016 Chayawat was selected in Thailand U23 squad for 2016 AFC U-23 Championship in Qatar.

International goals

under 23

Honours

International
Thailand U-19
 AFF U-19 Youth Championship 
  Winners (1) : 2011

External links
 
 Profile at Goal

1993 births
Living people
Chayawat Srinawong
Chayawat Srinawong
Chayawat Srinawong
Association football forwards
Chayawat Srinawong
Chayawat Srinawong
Chayawat Srinawong
Chayawat Srinawong
Chayawat Srinawong
Chayawat Srinawong
Chayawat Srinawong